The Serbian Orthodox Church in Kosovo is the second largest religious denomination after Islam. It has 100,000-120,000 followers in Kosovo, predominantly made up of the Kosovo Serbs, who mostly live in the North Kosovo region and in some enclaves in the south (such as Štrpce).

During 1999–2004, 140 Serbian Orthodox churches were destroyed. 30 of those were destroyed in the 2004 unrest in Kosovo, and many were destroyed in the 2008 unrest in Kosovo.

See also
Destruction of Serbian heritage in Kosovo

Annotations

References

 
Kosovo Serbs